The 1935 Cork Senior Hurling Championship was the 47th staging of the Cork Senior Hurling Championship since its establishment by the Cork County Board in 1887. The draw for the opening round fixtures took place at the Cork Convention on 27 January 1935. The championship began on 14 April 1935 and ended on 13 October 1935.

Glen Rovers were the defending champions.

On 13 October 1935, Glen Rovers won the championship following a walkover by Carrigtwohill. This was their second championship title and the second of eight successive championships.

Results

First round

Second round

Semi-finals

Final

Statistics

Miscellaneous

 The 1-05 to 1-02 defeat of Éire Óg by St. Colman's was their first ever championship victory.
 The championship culminated in a bloodless final or the first time since 1922. Carrigtwohill withdrew from the championship after complaining that they were not notified of the fixture according to the rules of the Gaelic Athletic Association. They also had several players injured in the semi-final and, consequently, were unable to field a representative team.

References

Cork Senior Hurling Championship
Cork Senior Hurling Championship